Vladimir Petrovich Kurayev (born 10 June 1969) is a former Russian professional footballer.

Club career
He made his professional debut in the Soviet First League in 1986 for FC Spartak Ordzhonikidze. He played 3 games in the UEFA Intertoto Cup 1997 for FC Lokomotiv Nizhny Novgorod.

Personal life
His son Dmitri Kurayev is also a footballer.

Honours
 Top 33 year-end best players list: 2001.

References

1969 births
Sportspeople from Nizhny Novgorod
Living people
Soviet footballers
Russian footballers
Association football defenders
FC Spartak Vladikavkaz players
FC Lokomotiv Nizhny Novgorod players
FC Tekstilshchik Kamyshin players
FC Kuban Krasnodar players
FC Saturn Ramenskoye players
FC Mordovia Saransk players
FC Nizhny Novgorod (2007) players
Russian Premier League players